Life's What You Make It is an EP by the English alternative rock band Placebo, released on 7 October 2016. It includes three cover songs (Talk Talk's "Life's What You Make It", Rowland S. Howard's "Autoluminescent" and Freak Power's "Song #6"), as well as the 2016 single "Jesus' Son" and two live recordings of "Twenty Years".

Background

Singer Brian Molko told The Independent that Placebo decided to cover "Life's What You Make It" because it's a 1980s song that the band still enjoys. In an interview with NME, he stated: "Our last single 'Jesus Son' and the Talk Talk cover 'Life Is What You Make It' are possibly two of the most commercial tracks that we've ever done. What we have a tendency to do it react allergically against what we’ve just done, so it's highly likely that the next thing we do will be something akin to career suicide."

A music video, directed by Sasha Rainbow, was released in June 2017. It was filmed at Agbogbloshie in Accra, Ghana, the site of one of the world's largest electronic waste dumps. Despite the film's setting, Molko explained: "The video is not anti-technology. It is about the triumph of the human spirit in the face of adversity that has not been chosen."

Release
The EP was released on 12" black vinyl, 12" springtime green vinyl and digital download.

Track listing

Charts

References

External links
 

Placebo (band) EPs
2016 EPs